St Fillans is a village in Perthshire in the central highlands of Scotland, in the council area of Perth and Kinross. St Fillans was a small clachan in the 18th century, known as Port of Lochearn, or Meikleport. In 1817 it was renamed St Fillans by Lord Gwydyr, the husband of Clementina Drummond, heiress to the Drummond Estate.

The pre-Reformation church, St Fillan's Chapel, whose kirkyard is the traditional burial place of the Stewarts of Ardvorlich, lies to the south of the River Earn, between St Fillans and the Iron Age Pictish hill fort of Dundurn. It is believed that the Irish missionary Saint Fillan lived on this hill. Not far from the foot of the hill is the Allt Ghoinean burn which is claimed to be the Gonan or Monan of Sir Walter Scott's poem The Lady of the Lake:

The stag at eve had drunk his fill, where danced the moon on Monan's rill.

There is a large hydro-electric power station in St Fillans, fed from a dam at Loch Lednock high above the village. The power station, which forms part of the Breadalbane Hydro-Electric Scheme, is not visible within St Fillans as it is underground and was hewn from solid rock. The golf course at St Fillans was created in 1903 by Willie Auchterlonie.

The section of the River Earn from St Fillans down to Comrie, along with much of the surrounding countryside, is designated as a national scenic area (NSA). It is one of 40 such areas in Scotland, which are defined to identify areas of exceptional scenery and to ensure its protection by restricting certain forms of development.

The village became the scene of controversy in November 2005 when a housing development was halted to avoid killing the fairies who allegedly lived under a rock on the proposed site. After some negotiation, the new housing estate was redesigned so that the rock in question was preserved, in a small park in the centre of the estate.

On the A85 just to the east of St Fillans lies the St Fillans Dragon and the St Fillans Toad.

References

External links

 Parish of Comrie in the Second Statistical Account of 1845

Saint Fillans
National scenic areas of Scotland